Buccinulum linea linea, or the lined whelk, is the nominate subspecies of the species Buccinulum linea. This is a marine gastropod mollusc of the family Buccinidae. It is found only in New Zealand, including the Chatham Islands.

References

 Quoy, H. E. Th. & Gaimard, P., 1833 Mollusques. Zoologie. In Voyage de découvertes de l'Astrolabe, exécuté par ordre du Roi, pendant les années 1826-1827-1828-1829, sous le commandement de M. J. Dumont d'Urville, vol. 2(2), p. 321-686
 Fischer-Piette, E. & Beigbeder, J., 1944. Catalogue des types de gastéropodes marins conservés au laboratoire de Malacologie. VI. Mitridae, Marginellidae, Olividae, Columbellidae et Conidae. Bulletin du Muséum national d'Histoire naturelle 16(1): 448-462, sér. 2° série
 Beu A., Cernohorsky W.O., Climo F.M., Dell R.K., Fleming C.A., Marshall B.A., Ponder W.F, Powell W.B., 1976. - A Neotype for Buccinum linea Martyn, 1784 (Mollusca, Buccinidae). Journal of the Royal Society of New Zealand 6(2): 221-225

External links
 Powell A. W. B., New Zealand Mollusca, William Collins Publishers Ltd, Auckland, New Zealand 1979 

Buccinidae
Gastropods of New Zealand
Gastropods described in 1784